Arthur O'Leary may refer to:

Arthur A. O'Leary (1887–1962), American Jesuit educator and president of Georgetown University
Arthur O'Leary (preacher) (1729–1802), Irish Franciscan preacher and polemical writer
Arthur O'Leary (composer) (1834–1919), Irish composer and pianist
Arthur O'Leary (soldier) (1746–1773), Irish soldier in the Austro-Hungarian army